José Rances Suárez Quintero (born January 3, 1998), nicknamed "El Demente," is a Venezuelan professional baseball pitcher for the Los Angeles Angels of Major League Baseball (MLB).

A native of Naguanagua, Venezuela, Suárez signed with the Angels as an international free agent at the age of 16 in 2014. After spending five seasons in the Angels farm system, he made his major league debut in 2019. On September 4, 2021, Suárez threw the first complete game of his career. In 2022, he accumulated over 100 innings pitched for the first time in his major league career.

Career
Suárez signed with the Los Angeles Angels as an international free agent in July 2014. He spent his first professional season in 2015 with the Dominican Summer League Angels and Arizona League Angels, compiling a combined 3-3 record and 2.97 ERA in 15 games (13 starts). In 2016, he pitched for the Arizona League Angels and Orem Owlz where he was 1-4 with a 4.84 ERA in 12 games (six starts).

Suárez played 2017 with the Arizona League Angels and Burlington Bees where he pitched to a combined 6-1 record and 3.28 ERA in 15 starts. He started 2018 with the Inland Empire 66ers and was promoted to the Mobile BayBears and Salt Lake Bees during the season. In 26 starts between the three clubs, he pitched to a 3-6 record with 3.92 ERA.

The Angels added Suárez to their 40-man roster after the 2018 season. He opened the 2019 season on the injured list with shoulder soreness, and was assigned back to Salt Lake upon his return. On June 2, Suárez was promoted to the major leagues for the first time to start versus the Seattle Mariners, where he picked up his first major league win. He finished the season with a 7.11 ERA in 81 innings, allowing 23 home runs. In 2020, Suárez recorded a 38.57 ERA after two starts lasting 2.1 innings in total before being optioned off the roster.

Suárez made his first major league appearance of the 2021 season on May 10 against the Houston Astros. He pitched four innings, allowing one run. He was the starting pitcher in the 2021 MLB Little League Classic. In four innings, Suárez gave up three runs and struck out four in the 3-0 loss to the Cleveland Indians. On September 4, 2021, against the Texas Rangers, Suárez pitched his first complete game, allowing one run and striking out eight batters.

See also
 List of Major League Baseball players from Venezuela

References

External links

1998 births
Living people
Arizona League Angels players
Burlington Bees players
Dominican Summer League Angels players
Inland Empire 66ers of San Bernardino players
Los Angeles Angels players
Major League Baseball pitchers
Major League Baseball players from Venezuela
Mobile BayBears players
Orem Owlz players
People from Carabobo
Salt Lake Bees players
Venezuelan expatriate baseball players in the United States
Venezuelan expatriate baseball players in the Dominican Republic